Lake Balangida is a shallow alkaline lake  in Hanang District of west Manyara Region in the Natron-Manyara-Balangida branch of the East African Rift in north-central Tanzania.

The area surrounding Lake Balangida is used for agriculture and grazing.

References 

Balangida
Balangida
Southern Eastern Rift